Roslyn is a village in the Town of North Hempstead in Nassau County, on the North Shore of Long Island, in New York, United States. It is the Greater Roslyn area's anchor community. The population was 2,770 at the 2010 census.

History 
Roslyn was initially settled by colonists in the year 1643. It was originally called Hempstead Harbor, but its name was changed to Roslyn in 1844 due to postal confusion regarding all the other "Hempsteads" scattered about Long Island. The name "Roslyn" was selected as the new name, as its location in a valley reminded officials of Roslin, Scotland.

Roslyn was incorporated as a village on January 11, 1932. Its first Mayor was Albertson W. Hicks, who was unanimously elected two days later, on January 13.

The former Rubel estate in the village was developed as the Roslyn Pines subdivision in the 1950s, consisting of roughly 102 homes.

The Ellen E. Ward Memorial Clock Tower in Roslyn was designed by Lamb and Rich, and was completed in 1895. It was sold to the Village of Roslyn by the Town of North Hempstead for $1 for its centennial in 1995.

Also taking place in 1995 was the opening of the Village of Roslyn's current Village Hall on Old Northern Boulevard.

Geography 

Topography 

Drainage 
Roslyn is split between two minor drainage areas: Hempstead Harbor (part of the Hempstead Harbor Watershed) and Mill River (part of the Mill River Watershed). The majority of Roslyn is within the Hempstead Harbor Watershed, meaning water in those areas drains north to Hempstead Harbor and ultimately into the Long Island Sound. Meanwhile, the southwestern edge of the village is within the Mill River Watershed, meaning water in that area drains south to the Mill River and ultimately into Hewlett Bay and the Atlantic Ocean. 

Additionally, all of Roslyn is located within the larger Long Island Sound/Atlantic Ocean Watershed.

Climate 
According to the Köppen climate classification, Roslyn has a four-season warm temperate climate (type Cfa) with cool, wet winters and hot, humid summers. Precipitation is uniform throughout the year, with slight spring and fall peaks. (Note, the labels in the chart below are backwards; metric units should be in parentheses.)

Demographics

2010 Census
As of the 2010 census the population was 86% White (76% Non-Hispanic White), 2.2% Black or African American, 0.2% Native American, 8.85% Asian, 2.6% from other races, and 2.2% from two or more races. Hispanic or Latino of any race were 11.2% of the population.

2000 Census
As of the census  of 2000, there were 2,570 people, 1,060 households, and 603 families residing in the village. The population density was 4,082.2 people per square mile (1,575.1/km2). There were 1,124 housing units at an average density of 1,785.4 per square mile (688.9/km2). The racial makeup of the village was 86.81% White, 2.33% African American, 0.08% Native American, 6.15% Asian, 2.02% from other races, and 2.61% from two or more races. Hispanic or Latino of any race were 6.34% of the population.

There were 1,060 households, out of which 25.8% had children under the age of 18 living with them, 47.3% were married couples living together, 7.1% had a female householder with no husband present, and 43.1% were non-families. 37.7% of all households were made up of individuals, and 9.5% had someone living alone who was 65 years of age or older. The average household size was 2.17 and the average family size was 2.89.

In the village, the population was spread out, with 18.2% under the age of 18, 3.6% from 18 to 24, 30.2% from 25 to 44, 25.3% from 45 to 64, and 22.7% who were 65 years of age or older. The median age was 44 years. For every 100 females, there were 83.8 males. For every 100 females age 18 and over, there were 78.4 males.

The median income for a household in the village was $72,404, and the median income for a family was $101,622. Males had a median income of $65,156 versus $45,221 for females. The per capita income for the village was $47,166. About 1.3% of families and 4.1% of the population were below the poverty line, including 2.9% of those under age 18 and 2.7% of those age 65 or over.

Arts and culture

The Bryant Library is located within the Incorporated Village of Roslyn. This public library, which serves large portions of the Greater Roslyn area, frequently hosts cultural events for the Roslyn community.

Government

Village government 

As of October 2021, the Mayor of Roslyn is John Durkin, the Deputy Mayor is Marshall E. Bernstein, and the Village Trustees are Marta Genovese, Sarah Oral, and Craig Westergard.

Representation in higher government

Town representation 
Roslyn is located in the Town of North Hempstead's 4th council district, which as of October 2021 is represented on the North Hempstead Town Council by Veronica Lurvey (D–Great Neck).

County representation 
Roslyn is located in Nassau County's 11th Legislative district, which as of October 2021 is represented in the Nassau County Legislature by Delia DeRiggi-Whitton (D–Glen Cove).

State representation

New York State Assembly 
Roslyn is split between the New York State Assembly's 13th and 16th Assembly districts, which as of October 2021 are represented by Charles Lavine (D–Glen Cove) and Gina Sillitti (D–Manorhaven), respectively. The heavy majority of the village is located within the 13th district, while small parts of the northernmost section of the village are located within the 16th district.

New York State Senate 
Roslyn is located in the New York State Senate's 7th State Senate district, which as of October 2021 is represented in the New York State Senate by Anna Kaplan (D–North Hills).

Federal representation

United States Congress 
Roslyn is located in New York's 3rd congressional district, which as of January 2023 is represented in the United States Congress by George Anthony Devolder Santos  (R–Glen Cove).

United States Senate 
Like the rest of New York, Roslyn is represented in the United States Senate by Charles Schumer (D) and Kirsten Gillibrand (D).

Politics 
In the 2016 U.S. presidential election, the majority of Roslyn voters voted for Hillary Clinton (D).

Education

School district 
The Village of Roslyn is served entirely by the Roslyn Union Free School District. As such, all children who reside within the village and attend public schools go to Roslyn's schools.

Library district 
The Village of Roslyn is located entirely within the service area of Roslyn's library district, which is served by the Bryant Library.

Infrastructure

Transportation

Road 
The William Cullen Bryant Viaduct (carrying New York State Route 25A) passes through and serves as a bypass of Roslyn. Prior to the opening of the Bryant Viaduct, 25A traveled through the heart of the village's downtown (along Old Northern Boulevard) and was notorious for its traffic jams in the area.

Other major roads located either partially or wholly within the village include Bryant Avenue, East Broadway, Layton Street, Main Street, Mineola Avenue, Mott Avenue, Old Northern Boulevard, Railroad Avenue, Roslyn Road, Tower Place, Walbridge Lane, Warner Avenue, West Shore Road, and Wittes Lane.

Rail 
Although no station is currently located within village limits, the Roslyn station used to be located on the Roslyn–Roslyn Heights border. It is now located completely within Roslyn Heights – just north of said border. This station, located on the Oyster Bay Branch, is the nearest station to the village.

Furthermore, the Oyster Bay Branch forms much of the village's eastern border.

Bus 
As of October 2021, the Village of Roslyn is served by the n20H, n21, and n23 bus routes, which are all operated by Nassau Inter-County Express (NICE). NICE's Port Washington Shuttle also offers limited services within the village.

Utilities

Natural gas 
National Grid USA provides natural gas to homes and businesses that are hooked up to natural gas lines in Roslyn.

Power 
PSEG Long Island provides power to all homes and businesses within Roslyn.

Water 

Roslyn is located within the boundaries of (and is thus served by) the Roslyn Water District, which provides the entirety of Roslyn with water.

Sewage 
The Village of Roslyn has a sanitary sewer system. The sewage from the Village's sewer system is pumped to and is treated by the Nassau County Sewage District's Cedar Creek Treatment Plant via the East Hills Interceptor line, which connects the village's system with Nassau County's.

Prior to having the sanitary waste treated by Nassau County's facilities, the village's sewer system expelled the sanitary sewage locally into Hempstead Harbor, contributing to water pollution problems.

Notable people
Deborah Asnis – Infectious disease specialist; Asnis reported the first human cases of West Nile virus in the United States in 1999.
Nathan Banks – Entomologist and arachnologist.
Michael Crichton – Author of Jurassic Park and creator of ER.
Allison Danzig – Sportswriter for The New York Times; author.
Judy Steinberg Dean – Physician, First Lady of Vermont (1991–2003) and wife of former Gov. Howard Dean, and Roslyn High School graduate.
Ken Hechler – Politician (D – West Virginia).
Jesse Itzler – Entrepreneur, author, and co-owner of the Atlanta Hawks.
Glenn Kurtz — Writer and author.
Edward Lampert – Chairman of Sears Holding Company.
Frank C. Moore – Artist and AIDS activist.
Lilly Pulitzer – Socialite and fashion designer.
Samuel Rubel – Executive.
Whitney Tower – Former president of National Museum of Racing and Hall of Fame.

See also
Roslyn Landmark Society
Main Street Historic District
Roslyn Village Historic District

References

External links

 Official website

Roslyn, New York
Town of North Hempstead, New York
Villages in New York (state)
Villages in Nassau County, New York
Populated coastal places in New York (state)
Populated places established in 1643